Walter Shirley (died 1425) was the member of the Parliament of England for Salisbury for multiple parliaments from 1411 to 1423. He was also a reeve and mayor of Salisbury 1408–1409 and 1416–1417 and a verderer of Clarendon forest.

References 

Members of Parliament for Salisbury
English MPs 1411
Year of birth unknown
1425 deaths
Verderers
Mayors of Salisbury
Reeves (England)
English MPs February 1413
English MPs May 1413
English MPs April 1414
English MPs November 1414
English MPs 1415
English MPs March 1416
English MPs October 1416
English MPs 1417
English MPs 1419
English MPs 1420
English MPs May 1421
English MPs December 1421
English MPs 1422
English MPs 1423